Pål André Helland (born 4 January 1990) is a Norwegian professional footballer who plays as a winger for Lillestrøm in Eliteserien. Helland arrived at Rosenborg on 26 July 2013 from the winner of the 2012 Norwegian Football Cup Final, IL Hødd. Helland has also spent time at Ranheim Fotball and Byåsen TF.

Career
Helland came through the ranks at Rosenborg before the 2009 season of the Norwegian top division, when he signed a three-year professional contract with the club. He had been part of the youth setup at Rosenborg since the summer in 2006 and made his debut for their B team against Molde FK right after he transferred. During the 2007 season he received the captains armband for their B team after impressive displays. He got his first minutes for the first team squad in pre-season 2008 in a friendly against FK Bodø-Glimt as a central defender. Although he plays best as a winger, Helland can play in various positions in the midfield and defence.

He left Rosenborg when his contract was not renewed in August 2011. He won the 2012 Norwegian Football Cup With IL Hødd, as the first team in fifteen years to win from a lower division.

In July 2013 he signed a contract with Rosenborg, that originally started as of 1 January 2014, after his contract would expire. On 10 July 2013, however, Rosenborg and Hødd agreed on a deal in the summer transfer window.
He joined Rosenborg on 26 July 2013. On 20 November 2016, Helland scored a hat-trick as Rosenborg defeated Kongsvinger 4–0 in the 2016 Norwegian Football Cup final.

Career statistics

Club

International goals

Scores and results list Norway's goal tally first, score column indicates score after each Helland goal.

Honours
Hødd
Norwegian Cup: 2012

Rosenborg
Eliteserien: 2015, 2016, 2017, 2018
Norwegian Cup (3): 2015, 2016, 2018
Mesterfinalen: 2017

References

1990 births
Living people
People from Hemne
Norwegian footballers
Association football midfielders
Norway international footballers
Norway youth international footballers
Rosenborg BK players
Ranheim Fotball players
Byåsen Toppfotball players
IL Hødd players
Eliteserien players
Norwegian First Division players
Sportspeople from Trøndelag